The Pasteur Institute in Ho Chi Minh City is a Vietnamese national institute initially created by the French in 1891 under the name Pasteur Institute - Sai Gon, in 1975 renamed the Institute of Epidemiology, and in 1991 given the current name.

Research

The research in this institute is about dengue fever, diarrheal diseases, HIV, leptospirosis and poliomyelitis.

Photo gallery

External links
 Official Website of Pasteur Institute in HCMC

Universities in Ho Chi Minh City
France–Vietnam relations
Medical research institutes in Vietnam
Ho Chi Minh City